Gīrō Qalah is the name of two villages in Afghanistan:

Gīrō Qalah, located in Maidan Wardak Province
Gīrō Qalah, located in Ghazni Province

References